This article refers to sports broadcasting contracts in Montenegro. For a list of rights in other countries, see Sports television broadcast contracts.

Football
Internationals:

FIFA World Cup: RTCG
FIFA U-20 World Cup: RTCG, Eurovision
FIFA U-17 World Cup: RTCG, Eurovision
FIFA Women's World Cup: RTCG, Eurovision
FIFA U-20 Women's World Cup: RTCG, Eurovision
FIFA U-17 Women's World Cup: RTCG, Eurovision
Montenegro national football team: RTCG (2022-2028)
UEFA Teams Friendly Matches (exclude Montenegro team) : Arena Sport (2022-2028)
European Qualifiers Road to UEFA Euro and FIFA World Cup: RTCG (only Montenegro matches), Arena Sport (all matches, exclude Montenegro team) (2022-2028)
UEFA European Under-21 Championship: RTCG
UEFA Youth Championships : Sport Klub, UEFA.tv
UEFA European Under-19 Championship
UEFA Women's Under-19 Championship
UEFA European Under-17 Championship
UEFA Women's Under-17 Championship

Leagues:

UEFA Nations League: RTCG (only Montenegro matches), Arena Sport (all matches, exclude Montenegro team) (2022-2027)
UEFA Champions League: Arena Sport (2021-2024)
UEFA Europa League: Arena Sport (2021-2024)
UEFA Europa Conference League: Arena Sport (2021-2024)
UEFA Youth League: Arena Sport
UEFA Women's Champions League: DAZN (2021-2025)
English Premier League: Sport Klub (2012-2022), Arena Sport (2022-2028)
English Championship: Sport Klub
English League One: Sport Klub
English League Two: Sport Klub
Spanish Primera League: Arena Sport
Spanish Segunda League: Arena Sport
Portuguese Primeira League: Arena Sport
Dutch Eredivise: Sport Klub
Russian Premier League: Sport Klub
Scottish Premiership: Arena Sport
Scottish Championship: Arena Sport
Ukrainian Premier League: Sport Klub
Austrian Bundesliga: Sport Klub
Swiss Super League:Sport Klub
Danish Superliga: Sport Klub
Norwegian Eliteserien: Arena Sport
Italian Serie A: Arena Sport
France Ligue 1: Arena Sport
Belgian League: Arena Sport
Czech League: Arena Sport
Serbian league: Arena Sport
Croatian League: Arena Sport
Bosnian League: Arena Sport
German Bundesliga: Sport Klub, Nova Sport (2021-2025)
German 2. Bundesliga: Sport Klub (2021-2025)
German 3. Liga: Sport Klub (2020-)
Copa Libertadores: Arena Sport
Copa Sudamericana: Arena Sport
Brazilian Serie A: Arena Sport
Argentina Primera Division: Arena Sport
Major League Soccer: Arena Sport
Australian A-League: Arena Sport
Australian W-League: YouTube
Chinese Super League: Arena Sport
Japanese J-League: Sport Klub (live coverage for J1 matches) and YouTube (live coverage for up to two J2 matches) (through 2022)
Korean K-League: Arena Sport
Women Bundesliga: Sport Klub (2020-)

Cups:

FIFA Club World Cup: RTCG and Eurovision (2020)
UEFA Super Cup: Arena Sport (2021-2024)
Recopa Sudamericana: Arena Sport
FA Cup: Sport Klub
Spanish Cup: Arena Sport
German Cup: Arena Sport
German Super Cup: Sport Klub
Italian Cup: Arena Sport
Netherlands Cup: Sport Klub
Russian Cup: Sport Klub
Scottish Cup: Sport Klub
Ukrainian Cup: Sport Klub
Turkish Cup: Sport Klub
Danish Cup: Sport Klub
Community Shield: Sport Klub
Italian Super Cup: Sport Klub
Carabao Cup: Arena Sport
French Cup: Sport Klub
Portuguese Cup: Arena Sport 
Greek Cup: Arena Sport
Polish Cup: Arena Sport
Brazilian Cup: Arena Sport

Futsal 
 FIFA Futsal World Cup: TBA (2020)
 UEFA Futsal Championship: TBA (2022)
 UEFA Under-19 Futsal Championship: Sport Klub
 UEFA Futsal Champions League: YouTube
 UEFA Women's Futsal Championship: Sport Klub, YouTube

Fight Sports

Bushido MMA: DAZN: October 2022 to October 2025, all fights
Dream Boxing: DAZN: October 2022 to October 2025, all fights
Glory: Arena Sport
Golden Boy: DAZN
King of Kings: DAZN: October 2022 to October 2025, all fights
Matchroom: DAZN

Basketball

NBA: Arena Sport 
Euroleague: Sport Klub
Eurocup: Sport Klub
VTB United League: Sport Klub
Turkish Basketball League: Sport Klub
Italian Basketball League: Sport Klub
German Basketball League: Sport Klub
ABA League: Arena Sport
NCAA: Arena Sport
ACB League: Arena Sport
Greek League: Arena Sport

Cups:
FIBA Intercontinental Cup: Arena Sport
Italian Basketball Cup: Sport Klub
Italian Basketball Super Cup: Sport Klub
Turkish Basketball Super Cup: Sport Klub
German Super Cup: Sport Klub

Tennis

Australian Open: Eurosport
Roland Garros: Eurosport
Wimbledon: Sport Klub RTCG
US Open: Eurosport
ATP Masters 1000: Sport Klub
ATP 500: Sport Klub
ATP 250: Sport Klub (most tournaments), Arena Sport (some tournaments), Eurosport (some tournaments)
WTA tour: Sport Klub
Davis Cup: Sport Klub

Motosport

Formula 1: Sport Klub
Moto GP: Sport Klub
Moto 2: Sport Klub
Moto 3: Sport Klub
NASCAR: Sport Klub
WRC: Arena Sport

American Football

NFL: Sport Klub
CEFL: Sport Klub
Serbian National League: Sport Klub
Aviva Premiership Rugby: Arena Sport

Handball

Spanish ASOBAL League: Sport Klub
Spanish Cup: Sport Klub
Spanish Super Cup: Sport Klub
Men's EHF Champions League: Arena Sport
Women's EHF Champions League: Arena Sport
German Bundesliga: Arena Sport
German Cup: Arena Sport

Volleyball

Men's CEV Champions League: Sport Klub
Women's CEV Champions League: Sport Klub
Italian Volleyball League: Sport Klub
Volleyball World League: Arena Sport

Ice Hockey

KHL: Sport Klub
EBEL: Sport Klub
NHL: Arena Sport

Athletics

Diamond League: Sport Klub

Water Polo
Adriatic League: Arena Sport

Cycling

Vuelta a España: Eurosport 
Tour de France: Eurosport 
Giro d'Italia: Eurosport

Baseball 
 MLB: Arena Sport

Montenegro
Television in Montenegro